The 1991 World's Strongest Man was the 14th edition of World's Strongest Man and was won by Magnus Ver Magnusson from Iceland. It was his first title. Henning Thorsen from Denmark finished second after finishing fourth the previous year, and Gary Taylor from the United Kingdom finished third. The contest was held in Tenerife, Spain.

Final results

References

External links
 Official site

World's Strongest
World's Strongest Man
1991 in Spain